While They Were Sleeping is the seventh full-length album by Candiria, released in October 2016. The band supported the album with their performance in the Vans Warped Tour in 2017. A music video was made for the title track.

Track listing
 "While They Were Sleeping" - 4:42
 "Mereya" - 4:56
 "Wandering Light" - 4:12
 "The Cause" - 2:36
 "Forgotten" - 3:44
 "One of You Will Betray Me" - 4:58
 "Opaque" - 2:56
 "The Whole World Will Burn" - 4:07
 "Behind These Walls" - 3:29
 "With Broken Bones" - 4:16
 "Ten Thousand Tears" - 4:54
 "Servitude" - 4:30
Total length: 49:20

Personnel 
Carley Coma - Vocals
John Lamacchia - Guitar
Michael MacIvor - Bass
Julio Arias - Guitar
Danny Grossarth - Drums

References 

2016 albums
Candiria albums